Park So-un (also transliterated Park So-woon, born 31 March 1967) is a South Korean equestrian. He competed in two events at the 1988 Summer Olympics.

References

External links
 

1967 births
Living people
South Korean male equestrians
Olympic equestrians of South Korea
Equestrians at the 1988 Summer Olympics
Asian Games medalists in equestrian
Asian Games silver medalists for South Korea
Equestrians at the 1986 Asian Games
Medalists at the 1986 Asian Games
Place of birth missing (living people)